The 1948–49 Boston College Eagles men's ice hockey team represented the Boston College in intercollegiate college ice hockey during the 1948–49 NCAA men's ice hockey season. The head coach was John "Snooks" Kelley and the team captain was Bernie Burke.  The team won the 1949 NCAA Men's Ice Hockey Tournament. The team's leading scorer was Jack Mulhern, who finished second in the NCAA in both goals (34) and points (65)

Season
Boston College, looking to return to the tournament and improve upon their overtime loss in the semifinal the year before, opened the 1948–49 season with a 13–5 win over MIT. In January they welcomed fellow tournament hopeful Colorado College for one game and took the close match 6–5, improving their record to 7–0. less than a month later they met the other eastern tournament team, Dartmouth, and lost their first game 2–4 in Hanover. They would make up for that win a month later by defeating the Indians at home. BC finished the regular season 17–1, never having to leave New England and only playing three game outside of the state and one other outside the greater Boston area.

In March the Eagles played two tournaments. The first was the NEIHL Tournament (a precursor to the Beanpot) where they won two narrow victories over Northeastern and Boston University to win the championship. With a 19–1 record Boston College received the top eastern seed and played Colorado College in the first round of the NCAA Tournament The Eagles won the game handily, scoring seven against the Tigers to earn their right to the play for the title. The championship game was a rubber match for BC and Dartmouth and for their third meeting the two teams did not disappoint. The game had three lead changes before Jim Fitzgerald put the Eagles ahead for good in the third period and Boston College won the title 4–3.

This was the last BC team to win an ice hockey championship for 52 years. This was the first team to win a national title where all players were born in the same state or province. The 1949 national title game was the first one held between two eastern teams, the next time two eastern teams would meet in the final game was in 1967.

Note: While BC was a member of the NEIHL, the conference was not officially recognized by the NCAA and the Eagles were technically an independent program.

Standings

Schedule
During the season Boston College compiled a 21–1 record. By winning the national title the team set a record for the fewest losses by a national champion that would stand until 1970. Their schedule was as follows.

* Denotes overtime periods

Roster and scoring statistics

Note: Boston College players wore sweaters without numbers.
Note: The Boston College record book lists the 1948-49 team as scoring 164 goals over the season but, in the player breakdown, has a total of 165 goals for the season.

Goaltending statistics

1949 national championship

(E1) Boston College vs. (E2) Dartmouth

Butch Songin and Jack Mulhern were named to the All-Tournament First Team while Bernie Burke made the Second Team

See also 
List of NCAA Division I Men's Ice Hockey Tournament champions

References

External links 

Boston College Eagles men's ice hockey seasons
Boston College
Boston College
Boston College
Boston College Eagles men's ice hockey season
Boston College Eagles men's ice hockey season
1940s in Boston